= Shalvi River =

River in India

Coordinates: 30.921°N 77.640°E

The Shalvi River is a tributary of the Yamuna (or Jamuna) River. The Shalvi meets the Jamuna once it flows down from western Himalayas.

Shalvi as a word means "Peace of God" derived of Shalviya.

There is a Hydroelectric power plant on Shalvi river producing 7 MW of electricity in Himachal Pradesh.
